Awrey Island is an uninhabited island located in Hudson Bay, within the Qikiqtaaluk Region of Nunavut, Canada. Quebec's Ungava Peninsula is to the east.

Geography
Characteristics of this isolated, young (less than 2000 years old) island include low-lying tundra and a rocky shoreline.

Fauna
The island is a Canadian Important Bird Area (#NU018) and a Key Migratory Bird Terrestrial Habitat site. It is notable for the common eider species.

References

 Awrey Island at Atlas of Canada

Islands of Hudson Bay
Uninhabited islands of Qikiqtaaluk Region
Important Bird Areas of Qikiqtaaluk Region